Naach is an Hindustani and Bengali word means Dance, it may refers to

 Naach (2004 film), Bollywood/Indian film
 Naach (2014 film), Lollywood/Pakistani film
 Dance in Nepal (dance; Nepali: नाच Naach, नृत्य Nritya)
 Dance in India (dance; from Hindustani and Bengali)
 List of Indian folk dances

See also

 
 Dance (disambiguation)
 Nach (disambiguation)